Take the High Ground! is a 1953 American war film directed by Richard Brooks and starring Richard Widmark and Karl Malden as drill sergeants who must transform a batch of everyday civilians into soldiers during the Korean War.

Plot
In May 1953, a new group of Army recruits at Fort Bliss in El Paso, Texas, encounter their drill sergeants, SSG. Laverne Holt (Karl Malden) and the deeply troubled SFC. Thorne Ryan (Richard Widmark). After Ryan's caustic appraisal of the recruits, Holt vows to make soldiers out of them during their sixteen weeks of basic training. The two men served together in Korea and are combat veterans; Ryan, though, resents his  stateside duty and repeatedly applies for a transfer back to the Korean front.

One night, the men cross the border to Mexico for recreation. In a bar, Ryan and Holt see a beautiful woman, Julie Mollison (Elaine Stewart), buying drinks for a group of young recruits, including some of their own. Later that evening, the two sergeants escort the inebriated Julie to her apartment, and Ryan finds himself drawn to her.

Training becomes more intensive. Ryan exposes his men to tear gas to prepare them for the harsh conditions of battle. Ryan and Holt return to the bar one night, and find Julie sitting alone. When the crude MSG. Vince Opperman (Bert Freed) insults Julie, she runs out of the bar in tears, and Holt comforts her. Ryan and Opperman fight, and Opperman reveals that Julie was married to a soldier who was killed in Korea shortly after she left him.

One day, recruit Lobo Naglaski (Steve Forrest) visits the camp chaplain to confess his murderous feelings toward Ryan, but comes to see that the sergeant has very little time in which to do a tough job. Tensions arise between Ryan and Holt, both over Ryan's callous treatment of the men and Holt's relationship with Julie. Ryan puts his men through increasingly tough drills; during field training, a bitter confrontation erupts between the two sergeants. Holt slugs Ryan and walks away.

Later, Ryan calls on Julie at her apartment, and they fall into a passionate embrace. She resists his further advances, however; he becomes insulting and casts aspersions on her virtue, chiding her for having given her husband "the brush" when she did.

Recruit Donald Quentin Dover IV (Robert Arthur) refuses to throw a hand grenade and, after the group has bivouacked as part of more field drills, he "goes over the hill", intending to desert.  Ryan tracks him down and gives the young man a second chance, confessing that his own father had been a deserter.

As the training period draws to a close, Ryan returns to Julie's apartment and discovers she has moved out. He finds Julie and Holt at the train station. After Holt leaves, Ryan apologizes for his behavior and asks Julie to marry him, but she sadly points out that he is married to the Army. Outside the train station, Ryan and Holt silently make their peace. The men finish basic training, and as the new soldiers march by during their graduation exercises, Ryan proudly points them out to a fresh group of recruits.

Cast
 Richard Widmark as SFC Thorne Ryan
 Karl Malden as SSG Laverne Holt
 Elaine Stewart as Julie Mollison
 Carleton Carpenter as Merton Tolliver
 Russ Tamblyn as Paul Jamison
 Jerome Courtland as Elvin Carey
 Steve Forrest as Lobo Naglaski
 Robert Arthur as Donald Quentin Dover IV
 Chris Warfield as Soldier
 William Hairston as Daniel Hazard
 Maurice Jara as Franklin D. No Bear
 Bert Freed as MSG Vince Opperman

According to a pre-production Hollywood Reporter news item, James Arness, Ralph Meeker, James Whitmore, William Campbell, and Richard Anderson, were cast, but they were not in the film.

Awards
The film was nominated for an Academy Award for Best Original Screenplay, losing to Titanic.

Production
The film was originally to be shot at the Marine Corps Recruit Depot San Diego, under the title The Making of a Marine based on an original by Millard Kaufman.  It was later asserted that "the Marines refused to cooperate because they did not want to stir up old controversies over the toughness of their training program." The Army, however, cooperated fully with the studio, and location filming took place at Fort Bliss, El Paso, Texas.

Reception
According to MGM records the film earned $1,968,000 in the US and Canada and $887,000 elsewhere resulting in a profit of $244,000.

Notes

External links
 
 
 
 

1953 films
Metro-Goldwyn-Mayer films
1950s English-language films
Films scored by Dimitri Tiomkin
Films directed by Richard Brooks
Korean War films
Films shot in El Paso, Texas
American war films
1953 war films
1950s American films